The FM H-15-44 was a diesel locomotive manufactured by Fairbanks-Morse from September 1947 to June 1950. The H-15-44 featured an offset cab design that provided space for an optional steam generator in the short hood, making the model versatile enough to work in passenger service as well as freight duty.

Raymond Loewy heavily influenced the look of the unit, which emphasized sloping lines and accented such features as the radiator shutters and headlight mounting, as is found on CNJR #1501 and KCS #40. The cab-side window assembly incorporated "half moon"-shaped inoperable panes which resulted in an overall oblong shape. The platform (underframe) was shared with F-M's  end cab road switcher, the FM H-20-44, as was the carbody to some extent. The platform and carbody was also utilized by the H-15-44's successor, the FM H-16-44.

Only 35 units were built for American railroads and none exist today.

Original buyers

References

Further reading

External links
 Fairbanks-Morse H15-44 Roster

B-B locomotives
H-15-44
Diesel-electric locomotives of the United States
Railway locomotives introduced in 1947
Freight locomotives
Standard gauge locomotives of the United States
Scrapped locomotives